The Parlamentarium is the visitors' centre of the European Parliament and is located in the Parliament's Espace Léopold complex in Brussels. The official opening was on 14 October 2011 by President of the European Parliament Jerzy Buzek. The permanent exhibition contains hundreds of multimedia components, explaining the European Parliament and other European Union institutions. The entrance to the centre is located on the Parliament's esplanade. It is the largest parliamentary visitors' centre in Europe, and the second largest in the world.

Each visitor is provided with a personal multimedia guide (PMG) which guides them through the exhibition, location is used to display content relevant to each area. All content in the Parlamentarium is available in the 24 official EU languages. Tours are held for children and for people who are deaf or blind. The PMG is needed to activate each installation and shows in-depth information, plays audio using an in-ear speaker and displays short films in the visitor's selected language.

See also
 House of European History

Notes and references

External links 

 

European quarter of Brussels
European Parliament
Government buildings completed in 2011
Visitor centers

fr:Parlement européen#Parlamentarium